Shrinathji Temple is a heritage Hindu temple in Manama established in the year 1817. The temple is dedicated to Lord Shrinathji, a form of Krishna, manifested as a seven-year-old child. The temple is located in the Bahrain's capital city of Manama.

History
The temple was constructed in 1817 by the Thattai Hindu community, who had migrated from Sindh  before the partition of India.

Key visitors

In 2019, the Indian prime minister Narendra Modi visited the temple and launched $4.2 million renovation plan for the temple.

Gallery

See also
BAPS Shri Swaminarayan Mandir Abu Dhabi in Abu Dhabi, UAE
Motishwar Shiv Mandir in Muscat, Oman

References

External Links 

Krishna temples
Hindu temples in Bahrain
19th-century Hindu temples
Buildings and structures in Manama
Temples in Manama